DanceSport Alberta is the governing body for amateur ballroom dance competition in Alberta, Canada.  It is a member of the Canadian Amateur DanceSport Association.

DanceSport Alberta was founded in 1989 as a non-profit organization.  In addition to Alberta, it has jurisdiction over Saskatchewan and the Northwest Territories, which do not have their own amateur associations.  Prior to 1989, dancers on the Canadian prairies belonged to the Western Canadian Amateur Ballroom Dance Association (WCABDA); DanceSport Alberta was formed when the WCABDA became DanceSport BC (British Columbia and Yukon only).

The organization's monthly email newsletter is called Pivotal Times.

DanceSport Alberta sanctions several annual competitions:

Alberta Winter Classic - Calgary  Featuring the Western Canadian Open Championships.  Hosted by DanceSport Alberta.
Northern Lights Classic - Edmonton  Featuring the Alberta Closed and Edmonton Open Championships. Hosted by DanceSport Alberta.
Wild Rose Ball - Calgary  Featuring the Alberta Open Championships. Hosted by Steve Van.
Calgary Open Dance Competition - Calgary  Featuring the Calgary Open Championships. Hosted by Ballroom & Country Dance Studio.

External links
 DanceSport Alberta
 Alberta Winter DanceSport Classic
 Northern Lights Classic
 Wild Rose Ball
 Calgary Open Dance Competition

Dancesport in Canada
1989 establishments in Alberta
Sports organizations established in 1989
Sport in Alberta